Expressway may refer to:
Controlled-access highway, the highest-grade type of highway with access ramps, lane markings, etc., for high-speed traffic.
Limited-access road, a lower grade of highway or arterial road.
Expressway, the fictional slidewalk transport system in Isaac Asimov's Robot series.